Pedro Francisco Carmona Estanga (born 6 July 1941) is a former Venezuelan business leader who was briefly installed as acting president of Venezuela in place of Hugo Chávez, following the attempted military coup in April 2002.

April 2002

The early part of 2002 saw mass protests and a general strike by opponents of Hugo Chávez. On April 11, 2002, following clashes between both supporters and opponents of Chávez, Lucas Rincón, commander-in-chief of the Venezuelan Armed Forces, announced in a nationwide broadcast that Chávez had tendered his resignation from the presidency. While Chávez was brought to a military base and held there, military leaders appointed Carmona as the transitional President of Venezuela.

In the face of crowds of Chávez supporters taking to the streets and under pressure from some quarters of the military, Chávez was restored to office.

During Carmona's 36-hour government, military officers held Chávez and attempted to force his exile. Additionally, security forces conducted raids without warrants and took some Chávez supporters into custody illegally, including National Assembly deputy Tarek William Saab, a member of the Chávez-aligned MVR, who was taken into protective custody by security forces after a large crowd had gathered around his home, threatening him and his family. He was held incommunicado for several hours.  

After the coup, Carmona was placed under house arrest, but he was able to gain asylum in the Colombian embassy after an anti-Chávez protest drew away his security detail. Later, he was granted asylum in Colombia, where he has worked as a tenured lecturer at the Sergio Arboleda University.

See also 

Presidents of Venezuela
List of Venezuelans
Carmona Decree

References

External links
BBC: Venezuelan coup leader given asylum
CBS: Venezuelan Coup Leader Exits
Latin Business Chronicle: Pedro Carmona: Actions, Not Words
BBC Mundo: Pedro Carmona, presidente por un día 
Venezuela's Attorney General Office requests formal charges of civilian rebellion against Pedro Carmona Estanga

Leaders who took power by coup
1941 births
Living people
People from Barquisimeto
Venezuelan businesspeople
20th-century Venezuelan economists
Andrés Bello Catholic University alumni
Venezuelan anti-communists
Venezuelan exiles